The 2018–19 UNC Wilmington Seahawks women's basketball team represents the University of North Carolina Wilmington during the 2018–19 NCAA Division I women's basketball season. The Seahawks, led by second year head coach Karen Barefoot, play their home games at the Trask Coliseum and were members of the Colonial Athletic Association (CAA). They finished the season 18–12, 11–7 CAA play to finish in a 3 way tie for third place. They lost in the quarterfinals of the CAA women's tournament to Northeastern.

Roster

Schedule

|-
!colspan=9 style=| Exhibition

|-
!colspan=9 style=| Non-conference regular season

|-
!colspan=9 style=| CAA regular season

|-
!colspan=9 style=| CAA Women's Tournament

See also
2018–19 UNC Wilmington Seahawks men's basketball team

References

UNC Wilmington Seahawks women's basketball seasons
UNC Wilmington